Yuri Omeltchenko (born 6 September 1971) is a Ukrainian Swedish orienteering competitor, winner of the 1995 World Orienteering Championships, Short distance. He also obtained silver in the 2003 Long distance World Championships, and shared silver on Sprint distance in 2004. He works in a school in southeast Sweden. The school is called Sunnadalskolan F - 9 in Karlskrona, he works as a physical education teacher. He enjoys riding bikes and swimming.

References

External links
 

1971 births
Living people
Ukrainian orienteers
Male orienteers
Foot orienteers
World Orienteering Championships medalists
Competitors at the 2005 World Games